The City of Wanneroo in Perth, Western Australia  was originally established on 31 October 1902 as a road board with a chairman and councillors under the Roads Boards Act 1871. With the passage of the Local Government Act 1960, all road boards became Shires with a shire president and councillors effective 1 July 1961. On 19 July 1985, Wanneroo attained City status, and the Shire president became a mayor.

The City was then split in 1998 with the southwestern section becoming the City of Joondalup and the remainder forming a reduced Shire of Wanneroo. It re-attained City status on 18 June 1999. As this was before the local government elections to elect a mayor and councillors, the second incarnation of the Shire did not have a president.

The current Mayor of the City of Wanneroo is Linda Aitken, who was elected to the position in September 2022.

Wanneroo Road Board

Shire of Wanneroo

City of Wanneroo

Notes
  On 10 March 1950, three councillors, W.G. Pearsall, W. J. Mowatt and E. Ashby, resigned. On 24 March 1950, an Order in Council was issued appointing a Commissioner, George Seddon Lindsay in his role as Secretary for Local Government, "until a new Board is duly elected". This election took place on 10 June 1950.
  On 17 December 1957, an Order in Council was issued appointing a Commissioner, Richard Rushton. The reason given was that "owing to the resignation of members, there are not now sufficient members to form a quorum of the Board of the Wanneroo Road District."
  On 12 November 1997, the Council was suspended for a period not exceeding two years by the Minister for Local Government and five commissioners were appointed. It was reinstated on 1 July 1998, only for the City to be immediately abolished and placed under the same five commissioners.

References

Lists of local government leaders in Western Australia
City of Wanneroo